The Atlantic 10 men's basketball tournament, an American college competition in men's basketball, has been held every year since 1977.

List

Source:

References